IFK Stockholm is multi-sports club in Stockholm, Sweden. It is most known for its football team.

Background
The club was formed 1 February 1895 as IF Kamraterna (IFK) by two young students, Louis Zettersten and Pehr Ehnemark, and was the first IFK club. The club soon changed name to IFK Stockholm to differentiate it from the other IFK clubs that were formed in various towns in Sweden.

The club had minor successes in the early days of Swedish football, but from 2008 to 2010, resided in Division 5, part of the regional leagues of the Swedish football league system. The club is affiliated to the Stockholms Fotbollförbund.

The club also sponsors bowling and swimming. It formerly also sponsored ice hockey and played its home games at the Hovet, formerly known as Johanneshovs Isstadion. It also played bandy, a sport in which it was the runner-up for the Swedish Championship in 1910. The men's bandy team has played seven seasons in the Swedish top division.

Season to season

In their most successful period IFK Stockholm competed in the following divisions:

In recent seasons IFK Stockholm have competed in the following divisions:

Attendances

In recent seasons IFK Stockholm have had the following average attendances:

Achievements
 Svenska Mästerskapet:
 Runners-up (1): 1905
 Corinthian Bowl:
 Runners-up (2): 1906, 1907
 Svenska Fotbollspokalen:
 Runners-up (2): 1903 II
 Wicanderska Välgörenhetsskölden:
 Winners (4): 1905, 1906, 1911, 1912
 Kamratmästerskapen:
 Winners (5): 1903, 1905, 1906, 1907, 1908
 Runners-up (6): 1911, 1912, 1913, 1914, 1919, 1922

Footnotes

External links
 
 IFK Stockholm – football department

Football clubs in Stockholm
Association football clubs established in 1895
Bandy clubs established in 1895
1895 establishments in Sweden
Stockholm
Defunct bandy clubs in Sweden